Eametsa is a village in Tori Parish, Pärnu County in southwestern Estonia.

Pärnu Airport (ICAO: EEPU) is located in Eametsa.

References

 

Villages in Pärnu County